Tijeras can refer to:

 Tijeras, New Mexico, a village in central New Mexico, USA;
 Tijeras Canyon, a canyon containing the village;
 Tijeras, Chiriquí, Panama
 Scissor kick, an acrobatic movement used in sports;